Maher Ben Omar Hannachi (born 31 August 1984) is a Tunisian footballer who plays as a winger.

Club career
Hannachi moved to Libyan Premier League club Ittihad Tripoli S.C. from US Monastir in the 2009–10 season. After spending two seasons at the Tripoli-based club, he returned to Monastir.

After a 5-year spell at CS Sfaxien, he joined Étoile du Sahel in July 2018.

International career

International goals
Scores and results list Tunisia's goal tally first.

References

Tunisian footballers
Tunisian expatriate footballers
1984 births
Living people
Al-Ittihad Club (Tripoli) players
US Monastir (football) players
CS Sfaxien players
Étoile Sportive du Sahel players
Ohod Club players
Tunisian Ligue Professionnelle 1 players
Saudi First Division League players
Tunisia international footballers
Association football midfielders
Expatriate footballers in Libya
Expatriate footballers in Saudi Arabia
Tunisian expatriate sportspeople in Libya
Tunisian expatriate sportspeople in Saudi Arabia
Libyan Premier League players